"Wedding Bells" is a song written and recorded by English duo Godley & Creme, released as the second single from their fourth studio album, Ismism (1981). The single peaked at No. 7 on the UK Singles Chart in December 1981.

The single's B-side, "Babies", a synth-pop song, was later included as a bonus track on the double CD compilation Freeze Frame...Plus + Ismism...Plus, released in the UK in 2004, and on a 2006 Japanese reissue of Ismism.

The single's cover was taken by music photographer Peter Ashworth.

Charts

References

External links

1981 songs
1981 singles
Godley & Creme songs
Songs written by Kevin Godley
Songs written by Lol Creme
Polydor Records singles
Songs about marriage